Hartley Jackson (born 17 April 1980) is an Australian professional wrestler. He is currently working as a freelancer. The main body of his career has taken place in Australia, USA and Japan. Between 2018 and 2019, he served as an official coach and producer for WWE NXT at the WWE Performance Center, before returning to Japan to wrestle for Pro Wrestling Zero1 (Zero1) in 2020.

Professional wrestling career

Australian career (1998–present) 
Hartley Jackson began wrestling in Adelaide, Australia, training under retired regional champion Col Dervaney. Jackson made his in ring debut on 4 October 1999. His first appearance in the PWI Top 500 was in 2001. In his early years he captured the MPW and WrestleRock Championships. He wrestled across the country and competed in a Survival Of The Fittest event, a 60 Iron Man minute match, before heading off on his first international excursion overseas.

In 2007 he began his rise to a heavyweight wrestler and teamed with Shane Haste to take on NWA Heavyweight Tag Team Champions, Karl Anderson and Joey Ryan in a set of matches for NWA Pro, which took place in Australia. Jackson got involved in an altercation with Australian sports journalist and news presenter, Mark Aiston, where the two would eventually square off in a pro wrestling match.

In 2011 Jackson would simultaneously hold the Zero1 UN Heavyweight Championship, PWA Heavyweight Championship and the EPW Australian national Championship titles. In 2014, Jackson wrestled NJPW's Shinsuke Nakamura during his first tour of Australia for Wrestle Rampage. Jackson continued to travel across Australia, winning the NWA Australian National championship. He formed the South Australian Serial Killers (SASK) tag team in 2014. Teaming with Jonah Rock, they went on to capture the MCW Tag Team Championship and WR Meltdown Tag Team Championship. Jackson was also part of The Mighty Don't Kneel (TMDK) in 2015 and 2016.

In his career in Australia, Jackson is a former two-time Wrestle Rampage Australian National Champion, former one-time AWA Heavyweight Championship, former two-time WrestleRock Heavyweight Champion, former one-time Professional Wrestling Alliance Heavyweight Champion, former two-time MPW Heavyweight Champion, a former one-time Melbourne City Wrestling Tag Team Champion, former one-time Explosive Pro Wrestling Tag Team Champion, former one-time Pacific Tag Team Champion and former two-time PWSA Hardcore Champion.

International career (2005–present) 
In the later half of 2005, Hartley Jackson travelled to the USA on his first international excursion with Mikey Nicholls where they were a tag team known as The Kerrigan's in All Pro Wrestling. In Los Angeles, Jackson continued to further his professional wrestling training under WWE Hall of Famer Antonio Inoki at the NJPW LA Dojo. Jackson wrestled on the NJPW Dojo events, co-produced with NWA Pro, that took place at the LA Dojo in Santa Monica, including a match for the NWA British Commonwealth Heavyweight Championship against Fergal Devitt. After his time at the LA Dojo, Jackson was recruited into the ranks of Japan's wrestling scene, where he worked one show with New Japan Pro-Wrestling (NJPW).

In October 2008 Jackson returned to Japan to take part in the "PROWRES EXPO 2008" in Tokyo's Ryogoku Kokugikan. In 2010 Jackson participated in his first tour for Zero1, where he would remain a fixture for the company. He formed a tag team with Steve Corino where they battled Akebono Tarō and Shinjiro Otani for the Intercontinental Tag Team Championships. Between 2010 and 2016 Jackson split his time competing in his home country of Australia, along with locales like Nepal, New Zealand and Myanmar. Myanmar held their first ever pro wrestling event at the Thein Phyu Stadium. The Myanmar Martial Arts Wrestling featured Hartley Jackson up against Masato Tanaka in a singles match.

Between 2016 and 2018 Jackson moved to Japan full-time to work for Zero1. During this time, he became a member of the Voodoo Murders, where he went on to capture the United National Heavyweight Championship (Zero1) and the Intercontinental Tag Team Championship (Zero1) which he held with Voodoo Murders leader, Yoshikazu Taru. Also in this time, Jackson participated in a series of Exploding Bat matches, fighting against Frontier Martial-Arts Wrestling's Atsushi Onita.

Jackson returned to Zero1 in 2020 on a permanent basis. He has fought for the World Heavyweight Championship and was named as one of the participants in this years 2020 Zero1 Fire Festival.

In his career in Japan, Jackson has wrestled for Zero1, Hustle, BJW, IGF, SWF, Ganbare Pro-Wrestling and Real Japan Pro Wrestling (RJPW) with one match for NJPW, along with earning championships to his name. He is a former two-time United National Heavyweight Champion and a former one-time Intercontinental Heavyweight Tag Team Champion. Jackson competed in the 2013 Zero1 Tenkaichi Jr. Tournament, dropping to 99.9 kg to make the competing weight, competed in the 2017 Zero1 Furinkazan Tag Team Tournament and also competed in the 2018 Zero1 Fire Festival. In 2018 he also picked up an MVP award for his match against Yusaku Obata for the World Heavyweight Championship. On September 3, 2022, Jackson defeated Yumehito Imanari to win the Spirit of Ganbare World Openweight Championship. He defended it two times before dropping the title to Mizuki Watase on December 27.

Coaching (2006–present) 
In 2006 Jackson became head coach of what is now called the Wrestle Rampage Dojo in Adelaide, South Australia. Over the course of the next decade, he went on to train and mentor many of Australia's current top talents, in which some have reached the heights of WWE and international recognition, including the likes of Bronson Reed, Brendan Vink, Mikey Nicholls, Billie Kay and Peyton Royce. Jackson is regarded as Australia's top pro wrestling trainer.

After a series of guest coach appearances, Jackson officially joined the WWE Performance Center as a part of the coaching staff in 2018. Jackson taught classes at the WWE Performance Center. Jackson helped recruit and scout wrestlers for the WWE both at the PC in Orlando and internationally. This included coaching at the first ever WWE Tryouts held in India, with over 70 participants.  Jackson also helped train the talent from local independent promotions for WWE's recruitment camps. In 2019 Jackson amicably parted ways with WWE to continue his professional wrestling career in Japan. In 2020, Jackson returned to Japan where he is once again an active wrestler, but also took over head coach duties for Pro Wrestling Zero1 at their Dojo.

Appearances and media 
Hartley Jackson appeared as tough guy in the 2008 Bollywood produced movie, Love Story 2050. In 2016, Jackson played the role of Connor in web series Runaway Moon and was a guest on the full episode of Talkn' Shop Live in Australia Presented by Talk is Jericho. In 2020 he appeared on WWE The Bump #36  and has appeared in multiple episodes of Samurai TV's Battlemen in Japan.

Lethwei 
On September 28, 2017, Hartley Jackson made his Lethwei debut at  Lethwei in Japan 5: Nexurise for International Lethwei Federation Japan in Tokyo at Korakuen Hall. He fought by the Burmese bareknuckle boxing rules, known as Lethwei, against YABU, in the company's first 100 kg heavyweight fight. Jackson lost to YABU via TKO at 0:53 of RD3. The fight was broadcast on FITE TV. Jackson has expressed interest in fighting again in the future.

Lethwei record 

|-  style="background:#FFBBBB;"
| 2017-09-28|| Loss ||align=left| YABU || Lethwei in Japan 5: Nexurise || Tokyo, Japan || TKO || 3 || 0:53
|-
! style=background:white colspan=9 |
|-
| colspan=9 | Legend:

Championships and accomplishments 
 Explosive Pro Wrestling
 EPW Tag Team Championship (1 time) – with Davis Storm
 State of Origin Champion 2016
 Ganbare☆Pro-Wrestling
 Spirit of Ganbare World Openweight Championship (1 time)
 Joint Promotions Wrestling
 JPW Championship (2 times)
 Melbourne City Wrestling
 MCW Tag Team Championship (1 time) – with Jonah Rock
 NWA Australian Wrestling Alliance
 Pacific Tag Team Championship (1 time) - with Havok
 AWA Heavyweight Championship
 Pro Wrestling Australia
 PWA Heavyweight Championship (1 time)
 Pro Wrestling Illustrated
 Ranked No. 210 of the top 500 singles wrestlers in the PWI 500 in 2011
 Pro Wrestling Zero1
 United National Heavyweight Championship (2 times)
 Intercontinental Tag Team Championship (1 time) – with Yoshikazu Taru
Fire Festival (2020)
 Wrestle Rampage
 Australian National Championship (2 times)
 WR Meltdown World Tag Team Championships (1 time) – with Jonah Rock
 WrestleRock
 WrestleRock Championship (2 times)
 Maximum Power Wrestling (MPW)
 MPW Heavyweight Championship (2 times)
 Pro Wrestling South Australia (PWSA)
 PWSA Hardcore Championship (2 times)

Notes

References

External links 
 
 

1980 births
Living people
Sportspeople from Adelaide
Australian Lethwei practitioners
Sportsmen from South Australia
Australian male professional wrestlers
Expatriate professional wrestlers
Expatriate professional wrestlers in Japan
Professional wrestling trainers
21st-century Australian people